The history of Katowice spans over 600 years.

Before World War I 
Today's city of Katowice in Poland started as a conglomerate of a number of small farming and industrial village communities from the 14th century. Katowice itself was first mentioned under its present name as a village in the 16th century. Following the annexation of Silesia by Prussia after the War of the Austrian Succession in the middle of the 18th century, a slow migration of German merchants began to the area, which, until then was inhabited primarily by a Polish population. With the development of industry, in the half of the 19th century the village started to change its nature into an industrial settlement. Katowice was renamed to German Kattowitz and around 1865 was granted municipal rights. The Prussian authorities hoped that the town with then 50% Polish population (by 1867), would gradually become a centre of Germanization of Silesia. The town flourished due to large mineral (especially coal) deposits in the nearby mountains. Extensive city growth and prosperity depended on the coal mining and steel industries, which took off during the Industrial Revolution. In 1884, 36 Jewish Zionist delegates met in Katowice, forming the Hovevei Zion movement. In 1873 the city became the capital of the new Prussian Kattowitz district. On 1 April 1899, it was separated from the district and become an independent city.

After World War I 
According to the Treaty of Versailles, the fate of Upper Silesia was to be settled by a plebiscite, which was held on 20 March 1921.  Over 85% of the city's population voted to remain in Germany, while the population in the surrounding rural district voted 56% in favour of Poland.  The Allies were in disagreement as to where the new border should be drawn, with the French proposal being more generous to Poland, while the British proposal was more favourable to Germany.  After rumours spread that the British proposal was to be adopted by the League of Nations, the Third Silesian Uprising broke out, and as a result, Katowice became part of the Second Polish Republic with a certain level of autonomy (Silesian Parliament as a constituency and Silesian Voivodeship Council as the executive body). A wave of Jewish settlers from other areas of Poland, particularly Galicia arrived to the city. The Jewish community played an important role in the development of Katowice and in 1937 a new Jewish communal building was erected.

German annexation during World War II 
After the 1939 invasion of Poland the town was annexed by Nazi Germany and became the capital of the Gau of Upper Silesia, replacing the former capital of Oppeln. During the invasion the Germans had burned the Great Synagogue. Under Nazi rule, many of the city's historical monuments were destroyed, the street names were renamed to German and the use of the Polish language was banned. During the occupation, the German administration organized numerous public executions of civilians and about 700 Poles were beheaded with a purpose-built guillotine. By the middle of 1941, most of the Polish and Jewish population of the city was expelled. Katowice was liberated by the Red Army in January 1945. Significant parts of the city centre were destroyed during the liberation.

After World War II 
In 1953 Katowice was renamed Stalinogród ("Stalin Town") by the Polish communist government. However, the new name was never accepted by the city's population and in 1956 the former Katowice name was restored.

Severe ecological damage to the environment occurred during the post-Second World War time of communist governance in the People's Republic of Poland, but recent changes in regulations, procedures and policies of Polish government since the fall of Communism have reversed much of the harm that was done.

Due to economic reforms, there has been a shift away from heavy industry, and towards small businesses.

External links
 The English translation of "Katowice: the Rise and Decline of the Jewish community; Memorial Book"